Rowlett (traditionally ) is a city in Dallas and Rockwall counties in the U.S. state of Texas, and an eastern suburb of Dallas. The total population estimate is 73,270 in 2021. It is a growing, upscale community with nearly $1.5 billion in development in the Dallas–Fort Worth metroplex, located on Lake Ray Hubbard.

History
Rowlett derives its name from Rowlett Creek, which flows into Lake Ray Hubbard and is a major tributary of the east fork of the Trinity River. The creek in turn was named for a waterway running through the property of Daniel Rowlett who moved from Kentucky to Bonham, Texas, in 1835. Daniel, who was a member of the Smoot-Rowlett political family, had no direct dealings with the town that now bears his name.

The first post office opened on April 5, 1880, and it was called "Morris" after Postmaster Austin Morris.

The town was later renamed "Rowlett". The Dallas and Greenville Railway passed through the town in 1886, connecting Dallas with Greenville, Texas, and the Missouri–Kansas–Texas Railroad. Shortly after its opening, the line was formally sold to the MKT.

In 1921 the town was a stop on the Bankhead Highway.

The town incorporated in 1952 when its population was 250. In the 1960s the town languished as Interstate 30 bypassed Rowlett.

The town has had a building boom since the completion of Lake Ray Hubbard in 1971 – growing to 1,600 by 1973; 10,573 by 1989; 23,260 by 1990; and 44,503 by 2000.

Rowlett gained international notoriety in 1996 when local resident Darlie Routier was convicted of murdering her children as they slept.

In 2003 the town made an unsuccessful formal proposal to get the Dallas Cowboys to move to a  "5-Point Park" on the banks of Lake Ray Hubbard when the lease for Texas Stadium expires.

In 2013 the Rowlett City Council was challenged by the Freedom From Religion Foundation and Metroplex Atheists regarding opening prayer invocations at city hall meetings. In a court case in May 2014 the U.S. Supreme Court reaffirmed a previous court ruling (Marsh v. Chambers) upholding the tradition of opening legislative sessions with sectarian prayer and additionally ruled in favor of a town's right to have invocations given by the predominant religion within its borders as long as it did not discriminate or coerce participation. (Town of Greece v. Galloway) Atheist proponents then asked the Rowlett City Council to be included in giving invocations. They were denied based on the Supreme Court ruling and city policy stating the invocation should be given by members of the community's locally established religious congregations."

On the evening of December 26, 2015 a violent storm produced a deadly EF4 tornado that tore a 13-mile path from the neighboring city of Garland, Texas, through the southeast portion of Rowlett, severely damaging or destroying hundreds of homes and vehicles along with several businesses and a city water tower.

On February 8, 2017, the historic water tower on Martha Lane built in 1980 was demolished two years after it suffered damage from the EF4 tornado on December 26, 2015.

According to the U.S. Census Bureau, the City of Rowlett is rated number 8 of the fastest growing cities in the United States with 5.1% growth from July 2017 to July 2018.

In 2019, the City of Rowlett gained regional recognition when Sapphire Bay Development, LLC and the City published plans to construct a master planned community in the middle of the Dallas/Fort Worth Metroplex. The 116-acre development will be Texas' first resort destination anchored by a man-made lagoon, offering guests a luxurious stay along its shore at the 500 room Sapphire Bay Resort, operated and managed by Destination Hotels by Hyatt. The project will also feature a surf village and a water park, 1,500+ residential units, 1.7 million square feet of mixed-use restaurant, retail, entertainment, office and hospitality space, 20+ acres of parks and trails, a 1,000 slip marina.

Geography

Rowlett is located at  (32.907020, –96.547415).

Demographics

As of the 2020 United States census, there were 62,535 people, 21,628 households, and 18,181 families residing in the city.

Education

Primary and secondary schools

The Dallas County portion of Rowlett is served by the Garland Independent School District, while the Rockwall County portion is a part of the Rockwall Independent School District.

Back, Stephens, Dorsey, Giddens-Steadham, Herfurth, Keeley, Pearson, Rowlett, Cullins-Lakepoint and Liberty Grove Elementary Schools, Coyle and Schrade Middle Schools, and Rowlett High School are located within the city boundaries of Rowlett.

Garland ISD has a free choice program that allows for a student to attend any school within the district. If a school is already full with students that are zoned for that school then students who are not zoned for that school, but chose the school on their choice of school form, will not be able to attend. The student will then be enrolled in their second or third choice school unless only the school they are zoned for is available. If students choose to attend a school located outside of where they are zoned the GISD is unable to provide a school bus service. Students living within two miles of their school can not receive bus service either.
Not all students in Rowlett are zoned for Rowlett HS. A considerable portion are zoned for Sachse High School in the city of Sachse. Rockwall ISD residents are zoned to Cullins-Lake Pointe Elementary School, Williams Middle School and Rockwall High School.

Colleges and universities
Residents in Dallas County are zoned to Dallas College (formerly the Dallas County Community College District or DCCCD). Residents in Rockwall County are zoned to Collin College.

Transportation
DART has transit that runs to and from Dallas. Rowlett is served by the Downtown Rowlett Station on the Blue Line. Automobile routes include President George Bush Turnpike, Interstate 30, and Texas State Highway 66 (Lakeview Pkwy).

References

External links
 City of Rowlett official website

 
Dallas–Fort Worth metroplex
Cities in Dallas County, Texas
Cities in Rockwall County, Texas
Cities in Texas
Populated places established in 1880
1880 establishments in Texas